Highway was a British television series, broadcast from 1983 until 1993. Presented by Harry Secombe, the show was a mixture of hymns and chat from various locations across Britain, produced by their respective regional ITV franchise holders. The programme was administered by Tyne Tees Television in Newcastle upon Tyne.

Guests sang religious songs, gave readings or talked about their lifestyles and spiritual feelings.

The series was broadcast on Sunday evenings. The final series was moved to Sunday afternoons. Highway was replaced by Sunday Morning with Secombe in which he would broadcast from the venue of the following Morning Worship service.

In the late 1990s, Secombe often presented the BBC programme Songs of Praise, which until 1992 competed directly against Highway in the Sunday evening slot.

References

External links
 
 

1983 British television series debuts
1993 British television series endings
ITV (TV network) original programming
British religious television series
Television series by ITV Studios
English-language television shows
Television shows produced by Tyne Tees Television